Dilson can be a given name or a surname. Notable people with this name include:

Given name 
 Dilson (footballer), São Toméan footballer who plays as a left back
 Dilson Funaro (1933–1989) Brazilian businessman and politician
 Dilson Herrera (1994) Colombian professional baseballer
 Dilson Torres (1970) former Venezuelan pitcher in Major League Baseball who played for the Kansas City Royals in their 1995 season
 Dilson Díaz, leader of La Pestilencia band

Surname 
 John Dilson  (1891–1944) American film actor